Busolwe Public Library, or the BPL, is a small community library in the village of Busolwe, eastern Uganda. The library consists of two schools and a center for Early Childhood Development (ECD) in order to improve the overall reading culture in the locality and to serve as an extension for learning beyond the classroom. It is part of the Uganda Community Libraries Association (UgCLA).

History
The Busolwe Public Library (BPL) was founded by the Lunyole Language Association (LLA) in 1996. BPL is the only community library serving Butaleja District in Eastern Region, Uganda which consists of over 200,000 people. Throughout its history, the library has had the opportunity to work with a number of organizations based outside of Uganda, such as Peace Corps and Go Global University of British Columbia. International partnership characterizes the continued growth and success of the library.

Library vision
As books are rarely found in average households in Busolwe, BPL aims to improve the overall reading culture in the locality. It also seeks to serve as an extension for learning beyond the classroom by offering school textbooks to students who do not have access to them at school and at home.  

With a relatively large collection of books in the vernacular language Lunyole, BPL hopes to contribute to the preservation of the language, which is one of the many endangered Niger–Congo languages in sub-Saharan Africa.

Library patrons
Patrons of the BPL consist mainly of students, teachers, and other concerned professionals who spend their leisure time reading. Young children under the age of 7 also come to the library to listen to stories read aloud by the librarian and volunteers. On average, more than 30 community members come to the library every day in order to read and study.

Partner organisations
 Uganda Community Libraries Association (UgCLA)

The Uganda Community Libraries Association (UgCLA), heads a network of community libraries in the country. As a member of the UgCLA, BPL is given a monthly stipend to employ a full-time librarian and also to purchase books and stationary.  The UgCLA also organizes workshops for librarians to be trained twice a year and other specific workshops throughout the year which focus on different techniques and approaches to learning.

 Lunyole Language Association (LLA)

The Lunyole Language Association (LLA)  was founded in 1964 to actively promote the use of Lunyole in Uganda.  The LLA has championed the writing and publishing of printed materials in Lunyole. The BPL is proud to host a collection of more than 100 Lunyole language storybooks for children.

 University of British Columbia (UBC)

The University of British Columbia (UBC) has begun a partnership with BPL since 2008, and sends over student volunteers through its Go Global International Service Learning Program. From working together, the local community members and international volunteers have enjoyed a fruitful partnership, leading rise to many of BPL's currents projects in the community.

 Local schools

The library also partners with many local schools to promote both the library and the reading culture through collaborative projects. These projects range from story-reading, safe sex seminars to reading competitions.

External links
  The Uganda Community Libraries Association (UgCLA)
 Butaleja District Information Portal
 Uganda Library and Information Association Twitter
 National Book Trust of Uganda

See also
Busolwe
Kitengesa Community Library

References

Libraries in Uganda
Butaleja District
Eastern Region, Uganda
Libraries established in 1996
1996 establishments in Uganda